Lil Uzi Vert vs. the World 2 is a reissue studio album by American rapper Lil Uzi Vert that was released on March 13, 2020. The album was released as the deluxe edition of their second studio album Eternal Atake, which was released a week before, on March 6, 2020. The album also serves as a sequel to Lil Uzi Vert's third mixtape Lil Uzi Vert vs. the World (2016). The album features new guest appearances from Chief Keef, 21 Savage, Future, Young Thug, Gunna, Lil Durk, Young Nudy and Nav. The sole guest feature on Eternal Atake is Syd.

The deluxe edition's release helped the original album to maintain its number-one position on the Billboard 200 for a second week, since both versions of the album were counted together for tracking purposes.

Background and release

In September 2017, soon after the release of their debut studio album Luv Is Rage 2, Lil Uzi Vert teased that they were working on a song for a sequel to their 2016 mixtape Lil Uzi Vert vs. the World. On July 31, 2018, they teased an upcoming album titled Eternal Atake. However, the album was continuously delayed for a year and a half. Eternal Atake was finally released on March 6, 2020. Soon after the long-awaited release of Eternal Atake, Uzi teased a deluxe version of their album on Twitter.

In the following days, Uzi teased that eight songs were going on the deluxe version of their album. On March 12, 2020, they revealed that 14 songs were going on the album. It was revealed shortly after that the tracks for their "deluxe album" were going to be on a separate album titled Lil Uzi Vert vs. the World 2, serving as a "second part" to Eternal Atake as well as the successor to Lil Uzi Vert vs. the World. Like its predecessor Lil Uzi Vert vs. the World, the cover art for the album is inspired by Canadian graphic novel series Scott Pilgrim. Chris Mench wrote for Genius that collaborations with Young Thug, Juice Wrld, and A Boogie wit da Hoodie were expected on the album. Lil Uzi Vert vs. the World 2 was released on March 13, 2020 at 8:00 AM EST. The album features multiple guest artists in comparison to the original Eternal Atake that contained a sole guest feature from American singer Syd. Brendan Klinkenberg of Rolling Stone wrote that while "Eternal Atake was all but devoid of features [...] its sister album has a murderer’s row of guest appearances."

Critical reception

Mehan Jayasuriya of Pitchfork reviewed Lil Uzi Vert vs. the World 2 separately from Eternal Atake. Jayasuriya stated that Lil Uzi Vert vs. the World 2 was closer to a deluxe edition than a separate album, describing the album as a "cobbled-together collection of B-sides", but good ones nonetheless. Jayasuriya praised "Lotus", "Myron", "Bean (Kobe)" with Chief Keef, "Yessirskiii" with 21 Savage and "Got the Guap" with Young Thug as the high points of the album. However, Jayasuriya noted that "some of LUV vs. The World 2's collaborations sounded better on paper" including Future, Gunna, and Nav.

Track listing
Songwriting credits adapted from Billboard.

Notes

 "Pop" is stylized in all capital letters

Sample credits

 "You Better Move" contains elements of the video game Full Tilt! Pinball.
 "Celebration Station" contains a sample of "Raindrops (An Angel Cried)", as performed by Ariana Grande.
 "Prices" contains a sample of "Way Back", written by Jacques Webster, Rogét Chahayed, Scott Mescudi, Kasseem Dean, Magnus Høiberg, Chauncey Hollis, Jr., Brittany Hazzard, and Carlton Mays, Jr., as performed by Travis Scott; and an interpolation of "Hickory Dickory Dock".
 "P2" contains a sample of "XO Tour Llif3", as performed by Lil Uzi Vert.
 "Futsal Shuffle 2020" contains audio samples from Nardwuar and a live rendition of "Boredom", as performed by Tyler, the Creator.
 "That Way" contains interpolations from "I Want It That Way", written by Andreas Carlsson and Max Martin, as performed by the Backstreet Boys.

Charts

Notes

References

2020 albums
Lil Uzi Vert albums
Sequel albums
Atlantic Records albums
Albums produced by Pi'erre Bourne
Albums produced by Nav (rapper)